The PlayStation Analog Joystick (SCPH-1110) is Sony's first analog controller for the PlayStation, and is the precursor to the PlayStation Dual Analog Controller. It is often incorrectly referred to as the "Sony Flightstick" (not to be confused with the Flightstick line of joysticks for PlayStation consoles by third-party peripheral manufacturer Hori).

History
Announced to the public in August 1995, the Analog Joystick was released to the public in Japan in early April 1996.

Features
The Analog Joystick used potentiometer technology previously used on consoles such as the Vectrex; instead of relying on binary eight-way switches, the controller can detect minute angular changes through the entire range of motion. The stick also features a thumb-operated digital hat switch on the right joystick, corresponding to the traditional D-pad, and used for instances when simple digital movements were necessary.

A compatibility mode for the Analog Joystick was included in the Dual Analog Controller, Sony's first analog revision of its original gamepad design.

PS1 games that support the Analog Joystick have an "Analog Joystick Compatible" icon on the back cover.

The Analog Joystick has a switch to select either analog or digital mode. When in the digital mode, both sticks function as the gamepad on a regular PS1 controller. Older PS1 games that do not support the PS1 DualShock sticks can work with the Analog Joystick.

List of games with Analog Joystick support

PlayStation

 Ace Combat 2
 Ace Combat 3
Adidas Power Soccer 98
Apocalypse
 Armored Trooper Votoms (Japan)
 Asteroids
 Atari Anniversary Edition Redux
Atari Collection 2 (Paperboy, RoadBlasters, Marble Madness)
ATV Racers
 Bogey Dead 6 (Japan as Sidewinder / Europe as Raging Skies), released at the same time as the Analog Joystick 
 Castrol Honda Superbike Racing
 Centipede
 Car & Driver Grand Tour Racing '98
 Choro Q Jet: Rainbow Wings (Japan)
 Colony Wars
 Colony Wars: Vengeance
 Cyberia
 Descent and Descent Maximum
Digital Glider Airman (Japan)
 Elemental Gearbolt
EOS: Edge of Skyhigh (Japan)
 Formula 1 97 (known as Formula 1 Championship Edition in United States and Canada)
 Formula 1 98
 Galaxian 3 (Japan & Europe)
 Gunship
 Independence Day
 Macross Digital Mission VF-X (Japan)
 Macross Digital Mission VF-X 2 (Japan)
 MDK
 MechWarrior 2: 31st Century Combat
 Metal Gear Solid
 Michael Owen's World League Soccer 99
 Arcade's Greatest Hits: The Midway Collection 2 (used in Blaster)
 Missile Command
 Motor Toon Grand Prix 2 (known as Motor Toon Grand Prix in North America)
 Namco Museum Vol. 4 (Assault and Assault Plus only)
 Newman / Haas Racing Nightmare Creatures Pitfall 3D: Beyond the Jungle Porsche Challenge Project Gaiairy (Japan)
 Racing Lagoon (Japan)
 Rise 2: Resurrection R/C Stunt Copter S.C.A.R.S. Sled Storm Shadow Master Sidewinder 2 Slamscape Spyro 2: Ripto's Rage! (Known as Spyro 2: Gateway to Glimmer in Australia and Europe)
 Spyro: Year of the Dragon Star Wars: Demolition Steel Reign Supercross 2000 Syphon Filter Syphon Filter 2 Syphon Filter 3 The Need for Speed (supports digital mode only)
 Treasures of the Deep Vehicle Cavalier (Japan)
 Vigilante 8 Wing Commander IV: The Price of Freedom Wing Over 2 Box Shot of Flightstick Logo
 Zero Pilot (Japan)

PlayStation 2

 R-Type Final (Both Analog and Digital mode)
 XG3: Extreme G Racing (Both Analog and Digital Mode)

There are other PS2 games that also can use the PS1 analog joystick, but only in digital mode. Metal Slug Anthology, Gradius III, Gradius IV and other games that normally use just the gamepad and buttons for controls.

List of games with partial Analog Joystick support

The following games support the controller's "analog" mode, but force the player to use the digital "hat switch" instead of the analog sticks:

 007: Tomorrow Never Dies 
 007: The World is Not Enough 
 Crash Team Racing 
 FIFA 99 
 FIFA 2000 
 FIFA 2001 
 Klonoa 
 NHL 98 
 Street Fighter Alpha 3 

And the following games are fully supported, but have issues that can affect gameplay:

 Ape Escape - the lack of L3 and R3 buttons on the controller makes some sections unplayable 
 Tempest X3 - works fully, but the game is set to auto-fire with the analog joystick connected
 World's Scariest Police Chases - the game will not recognise the analog sticks unless a Dual Shock is connected first and then replaced with the controller 

ReceptionGamePro''s The Rat Baron praised the controller for its comfort, tight control, button layout, and analog movement, though he expressed doubt that most players would go for it given the high price tag.

The Analog Joystick did not sell well in Japan, reportedly due to its high cost and bulky size.

Other 
The Analog Joystick can be connected to the PC via a USB adapter and also via a DirectPad Pro style parallel port interface which can be accessed under Windows using the DirectPad or other drivers. The Allegro library provides the same functionality for developers.

References

Game controllers
PlayStation (console) accessories